Trond Sirevåg (born 17 October 1955) is a Norwegian former professional footballer and former football manager. He played most of his career at Bryne FK and later became a manager of the sider for two different stints. He made only one cap for the Norway national team, which was during a friendly against Iceland in 1984 which ended in a 1–0 win.

References

External links
 

1955 births
Living people
Place of birth missing (living people)
Norwegian footballers
Association football defenders
Bryne FK players
Eliteserien players
Norway youth international footballers
Norway under-21 international footballers
Norway international footballers
Olympic footballers of Norway
Footballers at the 1984 Summer Olympics
Norwegian football managers
Bryne FK managers